Tom Lidén (born July 11, 1987) is a Swedish former professional basketball player.

Professional career
Liden signed with Kolossos Rodou in 2014

References

External links
 Tom Liden at fiba.com
 Tom Liden at Real GM.com

1987 births
Living people
Swedish expatriate basketball people in Greece
Power forwards (basketball)
Small forwards
Sundsvall Dragons players
Swedish men's basketball players
People from Södertälje
Sportspeople from Stockholm County